In Greek mythology, Torone (Ancient Greek: Τορώνη Toróne) of Phlegra, also called Chrysonoe, was a Sithonian princess as the daughter of King Cleitus and Pallene. She was the wife of Proteus and mother of Telegonus and Polygonus (Tmolus).

Mythology 
Chrysonoe was given in marriage to Proteus by her father Cleitus after the Egyptian foreigner came to Thrace and became his friend. Chrysonoe's sons had the habit of guest-slaying which forced Proteus to pray for his father Poseidon to carry him back to Egypt away from them. Torone's sons were ultimately killed by Heracles when they challenged the hero to wrestle them.

The city of Toroni in Sithonia was called after her.

Notes

References 

 Apollodorus, The Library with an English Translation by Sir James George Frazer, F.B.A., F.R.S. in 2 Volumes, Cambridge, MA, Harvard University Press; London, William Heinemann Ltd. 1921. ISBN 0-674-99135-4. Online version at the Perseus Digital Library. Greek text available from the same website.
 Conon, Fifty Narrations, surviving as one-paragraph summaries in the Bibliotheca (Library) of Photius, Patriarch of Constantinople translated from the Greek by Brady Kiesling. Online version at the Topos Text Project.
 Lycophron, The Alexandra  translated by Alexander William Mair. Loeb Classical Library Volume 129. London: William Heinemann, 1921. Online version at the Topos Text Project.
 Lycophron, Alexandra translated by A.W. Mair. London: William Heinemann; New York: G.P. Putnam's Sons. 1921. Greek text available at the Perseus Digital Library.
 John Tzetzes, Book of Histories, Book II-IV translated by Gary Berkowitz from the original Greek of T. Kiessling's edition of 1826. Online version at theio.com
Stephanus of Byzantium, Stephani Byzantii Ethnicorum quae supersunt, edited by August Meineike (1790-1870), published 1849. A few entries from this important ancient handbook of place names have been translated by Brady Kiesling. Online version at the Topos Text Project.

Princesses in Greek mythology
Mythological Thracian women

Greek mythology of Thrace